This is a list of statues of British royalty in London.

House of Mercia

House of Wessex

House of Denmark

House of Wessex – Restored

House of Normandy

House of Plantagenet

House of Lancaster

House of York
{|class="wikitable sortable"
! Image
! Monarch / ruler commemorated
! Location
! Date
! Sculptor
! Source
|-
|
| 
|
|
|-
|
| 
|
|
|-
|
| 
|
|
| -
|
|

House of Tudor

House of Stuart

House of Hanover

House of Saxe-Coburg-Gotha

House of Windsor

See also
 Queen Alexandra Memorial
 Queen Eleanor Memorial Cross
 Statue of Oliver Cromwell, Westminster

References

Bibliography

 
 
 

 
Lists of buildings and structures in London
Royalty, London
Statues, London
London, Statues
Public art in London
Monuments and memorials in London
Royal monuments in the United Kingdom
Royalty
British
Statues, London
Statues
Lists of monuments and memorials in London